Karposhtli-ye Olya (also Romanized as Karposhtlī-ye ‘Olyā) is a village in Jargalan Rural District, Raz and Jargalan District, Bojnord County, North Khorasan Province, Iran. At the 2006 census, its population was 985, in 253 families.

References 

Populated places in Bojnord County